Maxence Medjelled (born 4 November 1994) is a French professional footballer who plays as a midfielder.

Club career
Medjelled made his full professional debut in a 2–2 Ligue 2 draw against Tours in May 2014, coming on the pitch as a substitute for Adrien Coulomb.

References

External links
 
 
 Maxence Medjelled foot-national.com Profile

1994 births
Living people
Association football midfielders
French footballers
Ligue 2 players
Olympique de Marseille players
AC Arlésien players
Olympique Grande-Synthe players
US Pontet Grand Avignon 84 players
US Marseille Endoume players